The Seven Sisters is a 1915 American silent romantic comedy directed by Sidney Olcott. Based on the 1911 ensemble play Seven Sisters by Edith Ellis Furness and Ferenc Herczeg, the film starred Madge Evans, Marguerite Clark, and Conway Tearle. The film is now presumed lost.

Cast
 Madge Evans as Clara
 Dorothea Camden as Liza
 Georgia Fursman as Perka
 Marguerite Clark as Mici
 Jean Stewart as Ella
 I. Feder as Sari
 Lola Barclay as Katinka
 Conway Tearle as Count Horkoy
 George Renavent as Toni 
 Mayme Lunton as Gida
 Sydney Mason as Sandorffy 
 Charles Kraus as Innkeeper
 Camilla Dalberg as Mother
 Marjorie Nelson as Bertha
 Edwin Mordant as Baron Rodviany
 Dick Lee as Servant
 Lizzie Goode as Innkeeper's Wife

See also
List of lost films

References

External links

 
 
 Seven Sisters at sidneyolcott.com 

1915 films
1910s romantic comedy films
American romantic comedy films
American silent feature films
American black-and-white films
American films based on plays
Films based on works by Ferenc Herczeg
Films directed by Sidney Olcott
Lost American films
Paramount Pictures films
1915 comedy films
1910s American films
Silent romantic comedy films
Silent American comedy films